Carl Wilhelm Eugen Stenhammar (February 7, 1871 – November 20, 1927) was a Swedish composer, conductor and pianist.

Biography
Stenhammar was born in Stockholm and was the brother of architect Ernst Stenhammar. He received his first musical education in Stockholm. He then went to Berlin to further his studies in music. He became a glowing admirer of German music, especially Richard Wagner and Anton Bruckner. Stenhammar himself described the style of his First Symphony in F major as "idyllic Bruckner". He subsequently sought to emancipate himself and write in a more "Nordic" style, looking to Carl Nielsen and Jean Sibelius for guidance. The latter's Symphony No. 2, especially, had a great effect on him, leading him to change his style and withdraw his own First Symphony from performance. Having seen Sibelius's symphony performed in Stockholm, Stenhammar wrote to him:You should know that you are in my thoughts daily ever since I heard the symphony. You magnificent person, it is of course a huge armful of wonder that you brought up out of the unconscious and ineffable depth. That which I felt has been verified: You are in this moment for me as the foremost, the only, the enigmatic one.... I have also just written a symphony. At least it is called a symphony, and only in accordance with the understanding that you perhaps have forgotten should it be dedicated to you. However, nothing came of it. It is quite good, but somewhat superficial. I yearn to reach my inner self. And you can wait until I have arrived there. The great day when this happens, I will print your name in large letters on the title page. It may become a symphony or something else.The result of his search for a new style was the Second Symphony in G minor, composed nearly twelve years after the First Symphony, which shows the influence of Nielsen, Sibelius and Franz Berwald among others.

In autumn of 1892, Stenhammar moved to Berlin for seven months to study with Heinrich Barth, where he devoted his time to rigorous piano practice and composition. Barth was satisfied with Stenhammar's performances and gave him increasingly technically challenging pieces to practice, such as the Variations on a Theme of Paganini by Johannes Brahms, a composer he admired.

From 1906 to 1922 Stenhammar was Artistic Director and chief conductor of the Gothenburg Symphony, the first full-time professional orchestra in Sweden. In this capacity, he organised many performances of music by contemporary Scandinavian composers. In 1909, he briefly held the position of director of music at Uppsala University, where he was succeeded the following year by Hugo Alfvén. After moving back to Stockholm in the early 1920s, he returned to touring despite his declining health.

Wilhelm Stenhammar died of a stroke at 56 years of age in Jonsered in the historic province of Västergötland. He is buried in Gothenburg.

Work

His works were quite varied and included two completed symphonies, a substantial Serenade for Orchestra, two piano concertos, four piano sonatas, a violin sonata, six string quartets, many songs and other vocal works, including several large-scale works for chorus or voices and orchestra: the early ballad Florez och Blanzeflor, Op. 3, written around 1891, Ithaka, Op. 21, from 1904, the cantatas Ett folk (A people) from 1905 and Sången (The song), Op. 44, from 1921.

Writing in The Chamber Music Journal, R.H.R. Silvertrust opines that Stenhammar's six string quartets are the most important written between those of Johannes Brahms and Béla Bartók. Whether or not this is so, there is no denying that Stenhammar's quartets represent a very important development during the twenty-five years he was writing chamber music. Tonally, they range from the middle late Romantics to a style akin to mature Sibelius. Though not unknown by the Swedish chamber music public, his string quartets have been neglected elsewhere. In 2008 Musikaliska konstföreningen published the world premiere edition of his Allegro Brillante for piano quartet composed in 1891 and his Allegro non tanto for piano trio composed in 1895.

Stenhammar was considered the finest Swedish pianist of his time. Pianists who venture into the realm of the string quartet often wind up writing compositions that sound as though they were composed at, and are perhaps better played on, the piano. That Stenhammar's works show no such trait is because, for nearly half of his life, he worked intimately with the Aulin Quartet, the top Swedish string quartet of his day and one of the best then performing in Europe. In fact, he toured throughout Europe with them for many years and a piano quintet was nearly always featured on their programmes. Thus it is no accident that his quartets show a fine grasp of instrumental timbre and technique. The part writing is sure, always idiomatic and evenly distributed.

Stenhammar recorded five piano rolls for Welte-Mignon on 21 September 1905.

List of compositions 
Opera
 The Feast at Solhaug, opera in three acts for soloists, mixed chorus, and orchestra; libretto by Henrik Ibsen (Op. 6; 1892–1896)
 Tirfing, "Norse mythological music drama" in two acts (plus a prelude and postlude) for soloists, mixed chorus, female chorus, and orchestra; libretto by Anna Boberg (1897–1898)

Symphonies
 Symphony No. 1 in F major, for orchestra (1902–1903, withdrawn)
 Symphony No. 2 in G minor, for orchestra (Op. 34, 1911–1915)
 Symphony No. 3 in C major (1918–1919, fragmentary)

Concertante
 Piano Concerto No. 1 in B-flat minor, for piano and orchestra (Op. 1; 1893)
 Piano Concerto No. 2 in D minor, for piano and orchestra (Op. 23; 1904–1907)
 Two Sentimental Romances, for violin and orchestra (Op. 28; 1910)

Other orchestral works
 Excelsior!, concert overture for orchestra (Op. 13; 1896)
 Serenade in F major, for orchestra (Op. 31; 1908–1913,  1919)

Vocal works
 Florez and Blanzeflor, ballad for baritone and orchestra; text by Oscar Levertin (Op. 3; 1891)
 , for soprano, mezzo-soprano, tenor, mixed chorus, and orchestra; text by Viktor Rydberg (Op. 5; 1891)
 Ithaca, ballad for baritone and orchestra; text by Oscar Levertin (Op. 21; 1904) 
 One People, cantata for baritone, mixed chorus, and orchestra; text by Verner von Heidenstam (Op. 22; 1904–1905)
 Midwinter, rhapsody for mixed chorus and orchestra (Op. 24; 1907)
 The Song, symphonic cantata for soprano, contralto, tenor, baritone, mixed chorus, children's chorus, and orchestra (Op. 44; 1921)
 Around 60 songs

Chamber music
 Allegro brillante in E-flat major, for piano quartet (1891)
 String Quartet No. 1 in C major, Op. 2 (1894)
 Allegro ma non tanto in A major, for piano trio (1895)
 String Quartet No. 2 in C minor (Op. 14; 1896)
 String Quartet in F minor (1897)
 String Quartet No. 3 in F major (Op. 18; 1897–1900)
 Violin Sonata in A minor, for violin and piano (Op. 19; 1899–1900)
 String Quartet No. 4 in A minor (Op. 25; 1904–1909)
 String Quartet No. 5 in C major (Op. 29; 1910)
 String Quartet No. 6 in D minor (Op. 35; 1916)

Piano music
 Piano Sonata No. 1 in C major (1880)
 Piano Sonata No. 2 in C minor (1881)
 Piano Sonata No. 3 in A-flat major (1885)
 Piano Sonata No. 4 in G minor (1890)
 Three Fantasies (Op. 11; 1895)
 Piano Sonata in A-flat major (Op. 12; 1895)
 Late Summer, five piano pieces (Op. 33; 1914)

Stage
 A Dream Play, a drama by August Strindberg (1916)
 Lodolezzi Sings, a drama by Hjalmar Bergman; directed by Per Lindberg, Op. 39 (1919)
 As You Like It, a drama by William Shakespeare; directed by Lindberg (1920)
 Hamlet, a drama by Shakespeare; directed by Lindberg (1920)
 Turandot, incidental music for chamber ensemble to a drama by Carlo Gozzi; directed by Lindberg (Op. 42; 1920)
 Chitra, a drama by Rabindranath Tagore; directed by Lindberg (1921)
Romeo and Juliet, a drama by Shakespeare; directed by Lindberg (1922)

References

Citations

Sources

The Chamber Music Journal (1994), V (2): 1,4. Riverwoods, IL: Cobbett Association. .
Some information in the above article appears on the website of Edition Silvertrust. Permission to use, copy, alter and distribute has been given to Wikipedia under the GNU License and GFDL.

External links
 
Wilhelm Stenhammar Complete String Quartets (Nos.1-6), Violin Sonata Op.19 & Allegro Brillante for Piano Quartet Soundbites & Information
Biography on the site of the Swedish Music Information Centre
 Listen to Tre Körvisor - free MP3 recordings of : September, I Seraillets Have och Havde jeg en Dattersøn with  Umeå Akademiska Kör.
 Listen to a free MP3 recording of Vårnatt with  Hemavans Sommarkör 2006.
 

1871 births
1927 deaths
19th-century classical composers
19th-century conductors (music)
20th-century classical composers
20th-century conductors (music)
20th-century Swedish male musicians
20th-century Swedish musicians
Male opera composers
Musicians from Stockholm
Romantic composers
Swedish classical composers
Swedish conductors (music)
Male conductors (music)
Swedish male classical composers
Swedish opera composers
Uppsala University alumni